Eric Arthur Gardner (27 June 1881 – 24 May 1905) was an Australian rules footballer who played with Melbourne in the Victorian Football League (VFL). The younger brother of Corrie Gardner, Eric was a long kicking forward. He played as a wingman and missed out on playing in Melbourne's 1900 premiership side, in his debut season, through injury.

He entered Trinity College (University of Melbourne) in 1900, where he was a member of the football team that won the 1902 intercollegiate premiership, and also participated in athletics, winning the 120-yard hurdles and coming third in the long jump and at the University sports day in 1902.

Gardner died young in 1905 while in Sweden.

References

External links

1881 births
1905 deaths
Australian rules footballers from Melbourne
Melbourne Football Club players
People educated at Melbourne Grammar School
People educated at Trinity College (University of Melbourne)
People from Hawthorn, Victoria